Sri Manjunatha is a 2001 Indian hagiographical film directed by K. Raghavendra Rao and produced by Nara Jaya Sridevi. Shot simultaneously in  Telugu and Kannada, the film stars Chiranjeevi, Arjun Sarja, Ambareesh, Soundarya and Meena. Dwarakish and Mimicry Dayanand play supporting roles in the Kannada version while Tanikella Bharani and Brahmanandam replace them in the Telugu version.  The film is based on the life of the Shiva devotee, Bhakta Manjunatha of the Kotilingeshwara Temple.

The film was released on 22 June 2001 worldwide, while the dubbed Tamil version was released in Tamil Nadu in August 2001. Upon release, the film received positive reviews. The Kannada version was screened in the International Film Festival of India.

Background
Manjunatha is an aspect of Shiva. Manju means 'snow' and Natha means 'lord.' Since Lord Shiva resides on Mount Kailash, and hence the ruler of the Himalaya Mountains, as he is the lord of that loka (dimension), he is called Manjunatha.
Manjunatha is one of the most common names in Karnataka state for males and Manjula for females. Both are commonly called by the nickname name "Manju."  This is mostly because of the Sri Dharmasthala Manjunatha Swami Temple located in Dharmasthala, Karnataka.

Plot
Manjunatha is an atheist, but a good person helping others in need and fighting evil and so even though Manjunatha hates his namesake Lord Siva, the latter loves his would be devotee. Being an atheist, Manjunatha always scolds Lord Shiva which is watched by his vehicle Nandi and his attendant Bhrungi. Manjunatha meets Katyayini a to-become devadasi (Servant of the Lord) and marries her. Soon they beget a son, Siddhartha ("Siddhu"), who like his mother is a staunch devotee of Lord Shiva.

After marriage Manjunatha realizes the existence of Lord Shiva and slowly transforms himself into a great devotee of Lord Shiva and with his devotion, lights the lamps of the Manjunatha Temple in Dharmasthala without using a matchstick and wins the hearts of everybody including the local King, Ambikeswara Maharaju who invites him to his court where he felicitates Manjunatha much to Manjunatha's dislike where the king realises that Manjunatha is going to die.

In the meantime Manjunatha starts a Koti Lingam Puja with over 1,000 lingams worshipped and both Manjunatha and the king singing the Lingashtakam and performing the puja. Manjunatha is also troubled by his enemies and is aided by Lord Shiva who comes in various disguises to save his devotee and help him and his wife attain salvation.

Cast

Soundtrack

Kannada Version

Telugu Version

References

External links
 

2001 films
2000s Kannada-language films
2000s Telugu-language films
Indian multilingual films
Indian biographical films
Indian films based on actual events
Films about reincarnation
Hindu devotional films
Hindu mythological films
Indian epic films
Films directed by K. Raghavendra Rao
Films scored by Hamsalekha
2000s biographical films
2001 multilingual films